Trinity Valley School ("TVS") is a PK-12, co-ed, independent school in Fort Worth, Texas. Trinity Valley School has four main objectives for its students: fine scholarship with its fulfillment at college; the development of wide constructive interests; intelligent citizenship; and spiritual and moral development which promotes lasting values. Trinity Valley School is a member of the Southwest Preparatory Conference and is accredited by the Independent Schools Association of the Southwest (ISAS).

History

Trinity Valley School was founded in 1959 by George Bragg and Stephen Seleny. They were inspired to start a liberal arts school while on a tour of Europe with the Texas Boys Choir. Mr. Seleny became the school's first headmaster, a position he held until 1994. Initially, it was an all-boys school. Girls were first admitted in 1971. Today Trinity Valley School has approximately 1,017 students, and Blair Lowry serves as Head of School.

References

External links
Trinity Valley School

Independent Schools Association of the Southwest
Private K-12 schools in Texas
Preparatory schools in Texas